Diplocarpon mespili is a pathogenic fungus which causes quince leaf blight, a leaf disease affecting chiefly common quince. It occurs in wet summers, causing severe leaf spotting and early defoliation, also affecting fruit to a lesser extent. It may also affect other Rosaceae such as hawthorn and medlar, but is typically less damaging than on quince.

References

External links 
 Index Fungorum
 USDA ARS Fungal Database

Fungal plant pathogens and diseases
Dermateaceae
Fungi described in 1830